Jairo Samperio Bustara (born 11 July 1993), known simply as Jairo, is a Spanish professional footballer who plays as a right winger for Hungarian club Budapest Honvéd FC.

Club career

Racing Santander
Born in Cabezón de la Sal, Cantabria, Jairo was a product of local Racing de Santander's youth ranks. He was promoted to the first team immediately after finishing his development in 2011, by manager Héctor Cúper. He made his first-team and La Liga debut on 27 August, playing the last twelve minutes in a 4–3 away defeat against Valencia CF after coming on as a substitute for Manuel Arana.

On 21 September 2011, the 18-year-old Jairo started his first official game for Racing, in a 0–0 home draw with Real Madrid. On 25 October, he scored his first league goal in a 2–2 draw at Sevilla FC, and went on to start in 14 of his league appearances in his first season (1,248 minutes of action), which ended in relegation.

Sevilla
On 21 June 2013, after again dropping down a level with Racing, Jairo returned to the top division by signing a five-year contract with Sevilla, for a rumoured €2.5 million. He made his competitive debut for the club on 1 August, replacing José Antonio Reyes in the 19th minute of a 3–0 win over FK Mladost Podgorica in the third qualifying round of the UEFA Europa League.

Mainz 05
Jairo joined Bundesliga side 1. FSV Mainz 05 on 29 August 2014, on a four-year deal; the transfer fee remained undisclosed, but was believed to be in the region of €2 million. He finished his first season with 22 games and two goals, helping to a final 11th position.

On 5 December 2015, Jairo scored a brace to help to a 3–1 away win against Hamburger SV. On 2 March of the following year, he put the visiting team ahead at FC Bayern Munich after a 26th-minute cross from Giulio Donati, in an eventual 2–1 victory that handed the hosts their first home defeat of the campaign.

Las Palmas
Free agent Jairo returned to Spain on 1 January 2018, signing with top-flight strugglers UD Las Palmas until 30 June. His league debut took place 12 days later, when he started in a 6–0 away loss to Girona FC.

Hamburger SV
Jairo moved back to Germany in the summer of 2018, with 2. Bundesliga club Hamburger SV. He played just 19 matches in all competitions during his two-year spell at the Volksparkstadion – mainly due to a serious knee injury– scoring in injury time of the 4–2 defeat of Karlsruher SC in the domestic league.

Málaga
On 29 September 2020, Jairo agreed to a two-year contract at second-tier Málaga CF.

Career statistics

Honours
Sevilla
UEFA Europa League: 2013–14
UEFA Super Cup runner-up: 2014

References

External links

1993 births
Living people
Spanish footballers
Footballers from Cantabria
Association football wingers
La Liga players
Segunda División players
Tercera División players
Rayo Cantabria players
Racing de Santander players
Sevilla FC players
UD Las Palmas players
Málaga CF players
Bundesliga players
2. Bundesliga players
1. FSV Mainz 05 players
Hamburger SV players
Nemzeti Bajnokság I players
Budapest Honvéd FC players
Spain youth international footballers
Spain under-21 international footballers
Spanish expatriate footballers
Expatriate footballers in Germany
Expatriate footballers in Hungary
Spanish expatriate sportspeople in Germany
Spanish expatriate sportspeople in Hungary